Lloyd Forrester Bott   (8 April 1917 – 8 September 2004) was a senior Australian public servant.

Early life
Lloyd Bott was born on 8 April 1917 in Thornbury, Melbourne. He attended Northcote High School.

Career
After leaving high school, Bott qualified for the Commonwealth Public Service in 1933 and went to work in the Post Office in Sydney. He returned to Melbourne a year later and began to study at the University of Melbourne, Bachelor of Commerce, which he completed in 1948 when he returned from the Second World War, having served in the Australian Navy.

After his time as a 'yachtie' based in Dartmouth, Bott joined the Department of Supply, rising to become a Deputy Secretary in the department in 1967. He was responsible for the Administration of United States space projects in Australia during the time of the Apollo 11 moon landing.

John Gorton appointed Bott Secretary of the Department of National Development in 1969.  He was later Secretary of the Department of Tourism and Recreation, between 1973 and 1975.

Bott retired from the public service in 1977, his final appointment being Secretary of the Department of Immigration and Ethnic Affairs, which he had held since December 1975.

Awards and honours
Lloyd Bott was honoured with a Distinguished Service Cross in 1945, for his "gallantry, enthusiasm and great devotion to duty while serving in HM MGB 502 in hazardous operations."

In 2010, a street in the Canberra suburb of Casey was named Bott Crescent in Lloyd Bott's honour.

References

1917 births
Australian public servants
2004 deaths
Australian Commanders of the Order of the British Empire
Secretaries of the Australian Government Immigration Department
People from Thornbury, Victoria
People educated at Northcote High School